Pathfinder is the third album by the Scottish progressive band Beggars Opera, published in 1972.

Overview
The Mellotron, as found on its predecessor Waters of Change, had all but vanished. The music here is pretty much early '70s song-based progressive, typical of the British scene of the time, dominated by the Hammond organ. It is quite an accessible album with catchy and solid melodies.

Track listing

Personnel
 Ricky Gardiner - lead guitar, vocals
 Martin Griffiths - lead vocals
 Alan Park - keyboards
 Gordon Sellar - bass, acoustic guitar, vocals
 Raymond Wilson - drums
Technical
Barry Ainsworth, Roger Wake - engineer
Peter Goodfellow - sleeve illustration

References

Beggars Opera albums
1972 albums
Vertigo Records albums